Melech or Meilech (Hebrew מלך) is a given name of Hebrew origin which means king. It is a name used by Jewish people.

People 
 Melech Epstein (1889–1979), American journalist and historian
 David Melech Friedman (born 1958),  American lawyer and  ambassador 
 Meilech Kohn, American singer
 Melech Ravitch (1893–1976), Canadian Yiddish poet and essayist
 Melech Zagrodski, agronomist and 1939 Bialik Prize winner 
 , Israeli YouTuber

See also 
 Melchior
 Melik
 Moloch

References 

Hebrew-language names
Hebrew masculine given names
Jewish masculine given names